Mount Basurto is an ice-free mountain rising to  at the south end of Noring Terrace in the Convoy Range of Victoria Land. It was named by the Advisory Committee on Antarctic Names in 2007 after Juan Basurto, a cargo specialist and member of the US Antarctic Program logistics operation, who contributed to the movement of science team cargo to and from McMurdo Station in 21 austral field seasons from 1986 through 2007.

References

Basurto